Parimal Bose (born 16 October 1946) is an Indian former cricketer. He played one first-class match for Bengal in 1962/63.

See also
 List of Bengal cricketers

References

External links
 

1946 births
Living people
Indian cricketers
Bengal cricketers